Gilles-Paul Cauvet (1731-15 November 1788) was a French ornamental sculptor and cabinet-maker. Born in Aix-en-Provence, he took part in the furnishing of the Palais-Royal in Paris and designed furniture in Louis XVI style.

References
http://www.larousse.fr/encyclopedie/personnage/Cauvet/112182

1731 births
1788 deaths
People from Aix-en-Provence
18th-century French sculptors
French furniture designers